Gabriel Osei Misehouy (born 18 July 2005) is a Dutch footballer who plays as an attacking midfielder for Jong Ajax.

Career
A youth product of OSV and Ajax, Misehouy worked his way up Ajax's reserves and was their U17 captain. He signed his first professional contract with Ajax in September 2021. He made his professional debut with Jong Ajax in a 3–1 Eerste Divisie loss to Almere City on 21 February 2022 coming on as a sub in the 79th minute.

Personal life
Born in the Netherlands, Misehouy is of Ghanaian descent. He is a youth international for the Netherlands.

References

External links
 
 Ons Oranje U16 profile
 Ons Oranje U17 profile

2005 births
Living people
Footballers from Amsterdam
Dutch footballers
Netherlands youth international footballers
Dutch people of Ghanaian descent
Association football midfielders
Jong Ajax players
Eerste Divisie players

sq:Gabriel Misehouy